Altuntash (died 1032) was a Turkic Khwarazmshah from 1017 until his death in 1032.

Altuntash was originally a slave commander serving the Ghaznavid Sabuktigin. In 1008 he played a leading role in a battle against the Karakhanids at Sharkhiyan near Balkh, in which the Ghaznavids were victorious. By 1011 he had been made governor of Herat by Sabuktigin's son, Mahmud of Ghazni.

In 1017 Mahmud conquered Khwarazm from its Ma'munid rulers, and made Altuntash its governor. Altuntash's tenure as Khwarazmshah consisted of preventing the Oghuz and Qarluqs from making raids into the region. He also participated in Mahmud's 1025 campaign against the Karakhanid ruler of Transoxiana, 'Ali-tigin, in which Samarkand was temporarily occupied, and was present at the meeting between Mahmud and his ally, the Karakhanid ruler of Kashgar, Qadir-khan Yusuf.

In 1032 Mahmud's successor, Mas'ud struck a new alliance with Qadir-khan Yusuf against 'Ali-tigin, who had recovered his realm shortly after the Ghaznavids had left Transoxiana. Mas'ud ordered Altuntash to undertake a campaign against 'Ali-tigin, and he dutifully responded, invading Transoxiana. He met up with the Karakhanid army near Bukhara and engaged them in battle, but was mortally wounded. His lieutenant Ahmad Sirazi was able to conclude a peace with 'Ali-tigin, and shortly afterwards Altuntash died.

Altuntash never wavered in his loyalty to the Ghaznavids and in 1032 led an army at the battle of Dabusiyya against the Kara-Khanid ruler, Ali Tigin Bughra Khan. Though he was able to extricate his army from the indecisive battle, Altun died of wounds received in the conflict.  He had two sons, Harun and Ismail Khandan.  Haran was not made Khwarazmshah following his death, although he was effectively ruler of Khwarazm.

Notes

References
 
 
 
 

1032 deaths
Khwarezmid rulers
Year of birth unknown
11th-century Turkic people

de:Altuntaschiden#Abu Said Altun-Tasch (reg. 1017–1032)